Wah-wah (or wa-wa) is an imitative word (or onomatopoeia) for the sound of altering the resonance of musical notes to extend expressiveness, sounding much like a human voice saying the syllable wah.  The wah-wah effect is a spectral glide, a "modification of the vowel quality of a tone".

Etymology
The word is derived from the sound of the effect itself; an imitative or onomatopoeia word. The effect's "wa-wa" sound was noted by jazz player Barney Bigard when he heard Tricky Sam Nanton use the effect on his trombone in the early 1920s.

History

Acoustic
The wah-wah effect is believed to have originated in the 1920s, with brass instrument players finding they could produce an expressive crying tone by moving a mute, or plunger, in and out of the instrument's bell. In 1921, trumpet player Johnny Dunn's use of this style inspired Tricky Sam Nanton to use the mute with the trombone.

Electronic

By the early 1960s, the sound of the acoustic technique had been emulated with electronic circuitry. For electric guitar the wah-wah pedal was invented.

Technique
The method of production varies from one type of instrument to another. On brass instruments, it is usually created by means of a mute, particularly with the harmon (also called a "wa-wa" mute) or plunger mute. Woodwind instruments may use "false fingerings" to produce the effect.

Any electrified instrument may use an auxiliary signal-processing device, or pedal. Often it is controlled by movement of the player's foot on a rocking pedal connected to a potentiometer. An alternative to players directly controlling the amount of effect is an 'auto-wah'. These devices, usually make harder hit notes more trembly with a more prominent wah wah effect. Wah-wah effects are often used for soloing or for creating a "wacka-wacka" funk rhythm on guitar. Although these electronic means are most often on electric guitar, they are also often used on electric piano.

Theory
The wah-wah effect is produced by periodically bringing in and out of play treble frequencies while a note is sustained. Therefore, the effect is a type of spectral glide, a "modification of the vowel quality of a tone".

The Electronic wah-wah effects are produced by controlling tone filters with a pedal. An envelope follower circuit is used in the 'auto-wah'. Subtractive synthesis can produce a similar effect.

Notable uses
Tricky Sam Nanton's wah-wah on trombone in Duke Ellington's Orchestra became well known as part of the so-called "jungle" effects of the band in the late 1920s. This technique has been used in contemporary music. Karlheinz Stockhausen notates the use of the wah-wah mute in his Punkte (1952/1962) in terms of transitions between open to close using open and closed circles connected by a line. Although the most common method of producing wah-wah on brass instruments is with a mute, some players have used electronic filtering, notably Miles Davis on trumpet.

See also
Wah-wah pedal
Muted trumpet
Mute (music)
Subtractive synthesis
Porn groove

References

Sources

Further reading

External links
A YouTube video of electric guitar played with a Wah-wah pedal

Musical performance techniques

de:Dämpfer (Musikinstrument)#Blechblasinstrumente